In the California Route Marker Program, which designates county routes in California, only two highways exist in the "R" zone, which encompasses Riverside County. A third route existed until 1970.

R1

County Route R1 was converted into SR 243 in 1970. Its southern end was at SR 74 in Mountain Center and its north end was in Banning.

R2

County Route R2 is also known as Kaiser Road. Its southern end is SR 177 near Desert Center, and its north end is at Eagle Mountain, a modern day ghost town. Eagle Mountain is not openly accessible; its perimeters have been fenced and gated, with a site manager appointed to handle access requests.

The route was defined in 1964, and has not been altered since then.

Major intersections

R3

County Route R3 is also known by several other names along its route. Portions of the highway are called Sage Road, Cactus Valley Road, and State Street. Its southern end is SR 79 at Radec and its north end is SR 74.

At its north end in Hemet, it provides a major transportation route.

Historic information conflicts as to the date the route was defined. Some information indicates the highway was created in 1966, although other sources give a commissioning date of 1973. This is a former routing of SR 79.

Major intersections

See also

References

R*
Roads in Riverside County, California